Bni Rzine is a small town and rural commune in Chefchaouen Province, Tanger-Tetouan-Al Hoceima, Morocco. At the time of the 2004 census, the commune had a total population of 19,585 people living in 2630 households. Some of the families in Bni Rzine, like Acha(e)ffay, Mesbih, El Nasla, Amenchar, Nadi, Ahmadan, Azzouz, Tannan have their roots in the Hoceima region. Some famous people come from this village, such as Dutch journalist Ikram Akachaou Achaffaye (rip), author Saida Nadi or Khadija Nadi, entrepreneur in the impact field.

References

Populated places in Chefchaouen Province
Rural communes of Tanger-Tetouan-Al Hoceima